Robinson Graham (1878 – 13 May 1953) was a British trade unionist and politician.

Born in Burnley, Graham became a weaver and was active in the Burnley Weavers' Association, becoming its assistant secretary in 1911 and serving for many years.  He was also active in Labour Party, for whom he stood in the 1920 Nelson and Colne by-election.  He won the seat, but fell out with the United Textile Factory Workers' Association, which was sponsoring his candidacy, and the Labour Party leadership, and was pressured into standing down at the 1922 general election.  He concentrated on his trade union office; in 1941, he became secretary of the Burnley Weavers, serving until 1947. He died on 13 May 1953.

References

1878 births
1953 deaths
English trade unionists
Labour Party (UK) MPs for English constituencies
People from Burnley
United Textile Factory Workers' Association-sponsored MPs
UK MPs 1918–1922